Sandilianwali سندیلیانوالی / Sandhilianwali سندھیلیانوالی is a small town of Pir Mahal Tehsil in the Punjab province of Pakistan. It is near the Ravi River. Sandhilianwali is surrounding by green fields.

Famous Pirs such as Karam Ali Shah Bukhari (migrated to Dhole Depalpur tehsil), and Imam Shah Bukhari were born here who were brothers.

Darbar e Qutbia, located in the town of Sandhilianwali, is one of the oldest Muslim shrines in Central Punjab. It houses the remains of Sufi saint Syed Qutab Ali Shah Bukhari and is from the bloodline of Imam Shah Bukhari.

References
Location of Sandilianwali -  Falling Rain Genomics

Populated places in Toba Tek Singh District